Scopula conscensa is a moth of the family Geometridae. It was described by Charles Swinhoe in 1886. It is endemic to India.

References

Moths described in 1886
Moths of Asia
conscensa
Taxa named by Charles Swinhoe